Arthur Dean Cox (February 5, 1961 – July 10, 2020) was a former American football tight end in the National Football League. 

Playing college football at Texas Southern University, he went undrafted, and signed with the Atlanta Falcons before the 1983 season. He eventually became the Falcons' full-time starting tight end and had his most productive seasons in 1984 and 1985 (where he had a career high 454 receiving yards). Cox's productivity decreased in the following two seasons, and following the 1987 season, the Falcons chose not to resign him. Before the 1988 season, he signed with the San Diego Chargers, who later hired his old Falcons head coach Dan Henning. There, Cox immediately became a starter and maintained his reputation as a tough player and as a respected run-blocking tight end. In 1991, he lost his starter role, and was limited to playing in formations utilizing three tight ends. With the imminent reactivation of rookie tight end Duane Young from the injured reserve list, the Chargers released Cox on October 29. Cox subsequently was signed by the Miami Dolphins, but was waived on November 18, following two weeks of playing on special teams and goal line formations. He was quickly signed by the Cleveland Browns, for whom he played his last three NFL games.

Cox has one child (Artesha). Cox grew up in Plant City, Florida, as one of 10 children. His father died when Cox was young.

References

1961 births
Living people
People from Plant City, Florida
American football tight ends
Texas Southern Tigers football players
Atlanta Falcons players
San Diego Chargers players
Cleveland Browns players
Miami Dolphins players
Players of American football from Florida